Joseph Fennell (March 16, 1835 – February, 1919) was an Anglican priest born in Cobourg, Upper Canada.

Fennell graduated from Victoria College, Cobourg, and from Trinity College, Toronto. He founded St. Stephen's Church on Concession Street in Hamilton. Holy Trinity parish on corner of Upper James and Fennell Avenue was named for him.

Tribute

Fennell Avenue, a street on the Hamilton, Ontario Mountain was named after him.

References

1835 births
1919 deaths
People from Hamilton, Ontario
Trinity College (Canada) alumni
University of Toronto alumni
Canadian Anglican priests